Parliamentary elections were held in Serbia on 6 May 2012 to elect members of the National Assembly, and were held simultaneously with provincial, local, and presidential elections.

Background
The 2008 parliamentary elections resulted in the formation of a new pro-European government on 7 July 2008, with the necessary parliamentary votes coming from President Boris Tadić's For a European Serbia list, and the coalition of the Socialist Party of Serbia, the Party of United Pensioners of Serbia and United Serbia (the SPS-PUPS-JS coalition), plus six out of the seven minorities representatives. The new government elected Mirko Cvetković (endorsed by the Democratic Party) as Prime Minister.

The opposition, the Serbian Radical Party (SRS), had a split after the elections. The Serbian Progressive Party (SNS) party broke off and is headed by Tomislav Nikolić and Aleksandar Vučić, both of whom were major figures in the SRS before the establishment of the SNS in late 2008. In most opinion polls they and Democratic Party (DS) remain the two most popular parties, in combination gaining at least 60 percent of the total vote when combined. Other parties remain far behind, struggling to even attain double digit popularity figures.

In early 2011, according to the Democratic Party's strategic marketing polls, the opposition SNS had higher ratings than the next three most popular parties combined. The opposition attempted to promote early elections to take place in 2011. Major opposition rallies in February 2011 focused on the cited difficult socioeconomic conditions as well as widespread corruption. The protesters' goal was to hold the elections earlier, in the Fall of 2011. The protests did not succeed in affecting the date of the elections, which are to be held on 6 May 2012. At least 50,000 to 70,000 attended the peaceful protests held on streets of Belgrade organised by SNS, the strongest among the country's opposition bloc.

In fall 2011, posters and billboards endorsing various parties peppered Belgrade. The election campaigns of many parties are well under way, despite the election date having been set for the first half of 2012.

Electoral lists
There were 18 registered electoral lists for the 2012 parliamentary elections:

M — national minority list - the minimum threshold for these lists is 0.4% of the vote, compared to 5% for the others.

Opinion polls

Conduct
The Center for Free Elections and Democracy (CeSID) was amongst the electoral observers. CeSID was also an election monitor.

Results
About 6.7 million people were eligible to vote in the elections. The OSCE undertook the organisation of voting for the roughly 109,000 Serb voters in Kosovo. Voting stations were open from 7:00 to 20:00 with no incidents reported across the country. Voter turnout by 18:00 was 46.34% in Belgrade, 48.37% in central Serbia and 47.89% in Vojvodina. Voter turnout in Kosovo was 32%.

Involvement of the United States
In April 2012, Rudy Giuliani lobbied for Aleksandar Vučić in his candidacy for mayor of Belgrade. The US Embassy to Serbia released a statement saying that Giuliani's appearance did not represent the United States endorsing any candidate in Serbia's parliamentary upcoming election. Dragan Đilas, the incumbent mayor, responded to Giuliani's appearance, saying  "Giuliani should not speak about Belgrade's future as a man who supported the bombing of Serbia."

On 3 July 2012, the United States' Deputy Assistant Secretary of State, Philip Reeker, conducted undisclosed discussions with Mlađan Dinkić of the URS party in his first day there. When a journalist from B92 asked him what his mission in Serbia was, he replied that he was visiting "because Belgrade is a beautiful city". Subsequently, URS joined the ruling coalition in the Serbian parliament. At the time, Blic published a series of stories from anonymous diplomatic sources, correctly predicting a coalition with URS and SNS, asserting that Reeker's meetings in Belgrade were intended to ensure that the new ruling coalition involve parties which guarantee the continuation of the Belgrade–Pristina negotiations. Additionally, Blic reported that Vučić was against SPS members leading both the BIA and the Ministry of Internal Affairs, and asserted that the United States was in agreement with Vučić in disapproval of SPS controlling both state agencies.

References

External links

Republic Electoral Commission (RIK)
Center for Free Elections and Democracy (CeSID)
EIzbori

Serbia
Elections in Serbia
Serbi
Foreign electoral intervention
Parliament